DXSW (91.1 FM), broadcasting as 91.1 Radyo Natin, is a radio station owned and operated by Manila Broadcasting Company. Its studios and transmitters are located along P. Castillo St., Brgy. Mangagoy, Bislig.

References

Radio stations in Surigao del Sur
Radio stations established in 2002